Lakhan is a village in Muzzfarnagar (MOZ) District (Perhaps Muzzfarnagar sub Division as well) in Uttar Pradesh, India.

References

Villages in Muzaffarnagar district